Stanislas de Barbeyrac is a French operatic tenor.

De Barbeyrac studied with Lionel Sarrazin at the Bordeaux Conservatoire in 2004, before joining the Atelier Lyrique at the Paris Opera in 2008.

In 2014, he made his debut with The Royal Opera as Arbace in Idomeneo.

In 2016–17, he made US debut with San Francisco Opera as Don Ottavio in Don Giovanni.

Awards
De Barbeyrac has won the Prix du Cercle Carpeaux and the Prix Lyrique de l'AROP. In 2011, he won at the Queen Elizabeth International Competition in Brussels.

References

Living people
French operatic tenors
21st-century French male opera singers
Conservatoire de Bordeaux alumni
Year of birth missing (living people)